Bălcăuți is a commune in Briceni District, Moldova. It is composed of two villages, Bălcăuți and Bocicăuți.

References

Communes of Briceni District